Didsbury Village is a tram stop on the South Manchester Line on the light-rail Metrolink network in Greater Manchester,  England. It serves the South Manchester suburb of Didsbury.

History
The Manchester South District Line was opened by the Midland Railway in 1880. Originally, Didsbury was served by Didsbury railway station, which was located opposite Didsbury Library on Wilmslow Road, approximately  further north along the line from the present tram stop. The railway station was closed in 1967 as part of the Beeching cuts and was demolished in 1982, and the old railway line lay derelict for several decades.

In 1984, Greater Manchester Council and GMPTE announced the Project Light Rail scheme to develop a new light rail/tram system by re-opening use of disused railway lines in the region, including the route through Didsbury. The first phase of the Manchester Metrolink system opened in 1992, but it was not until 2013 that the network was expanded to reach Didsbury, as part of Phase 3b of the Metrolink expansion project. Tram tracks were laid along the former trackbed, but as Didsbury station had been demolished over 30 years earlier, a new tram stop was constructed further down the line on School Lane.

There were plans to extend the line to Stockport, which were cancelled on grounds of cost.

Service pattern 

References

Sources

External links

 https://web.archive.org/web/20130226053951/http://www.lrta.org/Manchester/city_south.html
 Metrolink stop information
 Didsbury Village area map

Didsbury
Tram stops in Manchester
Railway stations in Great Britain opened in 2013
Manchester South District Line
Tram stops on the East Didsbury to Rochdale line